Steve Willis (born 5 June 1976), also known as Commando Steve, is an Australian personal trainer, author and television personality. He appeared on the Australian version of The Biggest Loser as a trainer from 2007 to 2015.

Early life
Willis was born in Brisbane, Queensland, but grew up in Redcliffe. He is the eldest of four brothers.

Willis initially wanted to be a builder, but he joined the army in the 1990s. He started out in the Infantry, before being posted to the 4th Battalion, Royal Australian Regiment as a fitness instructor (later 2nd Commando Regiment). Willis left the army in 2004 (The Second Commando Regiment was formed in 2009 on the 19th of June, according to the ADF) having never passed Commando Selection Course. While working as a labourer, he studied personal training and specialises in CrossFit. Willis also competes in CrossFit Games. During a 2009 CrossFit competition, he came fourth out of 75 male competitors.

Television career
In 2007, Willis joined the cast of The Biggest Loser as a trainer. Willis was known for wearing dark sunglasses, camo pants, and a black sleeveless shirt. Rarely smiling on the show, his motto was "there are no excuses". Speaking to Nick Galvin of The Sydney Morning Herald, Willis said, "When it comes to the training and my ethos, Steve Willis and the screen persona 'The Commando' are the same person. I believe passionately in what I do". Willis chose to depart The Biggest Loser after the tenth season aired in 2015.

In May 2018, Willis made his acting debut in television soap opera Home and Away, with a guest appearance as an AFP trainer. Two months later, it was confirmed that Willis had joined the cast of Australian Survivor: Champions vs. Contenders, which began airing in August. Willis became the 18th person eliminated from the show, and the 5th jury member.

Personal life
Willis was in a relationship with fellow Biggest Loser trainer Michelle Bridges. Bridges gave birth to their first child, a son, in 2015. Willis has three more children from previous relationships.

Bibliography
Commando Steve: No Excuses! (2010)
Get Commando Fit (2015)
Get Commando Fit Cookbook (2015)

References

External links
 
 Management profile

Living people
1976 births
Australian exercise instructors
Australian exercise and fitness writers
Australian television personalities
Writers from Brisbane
Australian Survivor contestants